The German-Pennsylvanian Association is an organization founded in 2003 in the Rheinhessen area of Ober-Olm in Germany, and dedicated to cultural exchange and research involving the Pennsylvania Dutch language and people. The registered seat of the organization is in the Rhineland-Palatinate capital of Mainz.

Overview 
The goals of the organization are to promote cultural exchange between Pennsylvanian (United States) residents of German descent and their main region of origin in Southwest Germany, to encourage the creation of joint initiatives and sister city partnerships, and to promote the study of Pennsylvania Dutch history, language, and culture. Many of the members are linguists and historians or others from Germany or the United States who are interested in genealogy and the Pennsylvania Dutch culture.

Executive committee
The executive committee is composed of five members elected every three years. The first top chairperson was publishing editor Dr. Michael Werner who established the Pennsylvania German newspaper Hiwwe wie Driwwe and an archive for Pennsylvania Dutch literature in Ober-Olm. He served as president between 2003 and 2010. Since April 2010, Frank Kessler (Brussels) is the top chairperson of the association.

See also 
 Pfälzisch language
 Pennsylvania Dutch language
 Pennsylvania German Society
 Hiwwe wie Driwwe
 German-Pennsylvanian Archive

External links
 Deutsch-Pennsylvanischer Arbeitskreis e. V.
 En Friehyaahr fer die Mudderschprooch
 Hiwwe wie Driwwe - The Pennsylvania German Newspaper

Amish in Europe
Pennsylvania Dutch culture
Pennsylvania Dutch language